Audio player refers to:

Cassette player, a piece of hardware for playing audio cassettes
CD player, an electronic device that plays audio compact discs
Digital audio player, a piece of hardware for playing audio files
Audio player (software), a piece of computer software for playing audio files
 MP3 player, a digital audio player